The 1984–85 Gonzaga Bulldogs men's basketball team represented Gonzaga University of Spokane, Washington, in the 1984–85 NCAA Division I men's basketball season. Led by fourth-year head coach Jay Hillock, the Bulldogs were  overall  and played their home games on campus at Kennedy Pavilion.

Following the season in early April, Hillock resigned and athletic director Dan Fitzgerald resumed his former role as

References

External links
Sports Reference – Gonzaga Bulldogs men's basketball – 1984–85 season

Gonzaga Bulldogs men's basketball seasons
Gonzaga
1984 in sports in Washington (state)
1985 in sports in Washington (state)